Bacillus thuringiensis serotype israelensis (Bti) is a group of bacteria used as biological control agents for larvae stages of certain dipterans. Bti produces toxins which are effective in killing various species of mosquitoes, fungus gnats, and blackflies, while having almost no effect on other organisms. The major advantage of B. thuringiensis products is that they are thought to affect few non-target species. However, even though Bti may have minimal direct effects on non-target organisms, it may potentially be associated with knock-on effects on food webs and other ecosystem properties, including biodiversity and ecosystem functioning.

Bti strains possess the pBtoxis plasmid which encodes numerous Cry (a δ-endotoxin) and Cyt toxins, including Cry4, Cry10, Cry11, Cyt1, and Cyt2. The crystal aggregation which these toxins form contains at least four major toxic components, but the extent to which each Cry and Cyt protein is represented is not known and likely to vary with strain and formulation. Both Cry and Cyt proteins are pore-forming toxins; they lyse midgut epithelial cells by inserting into the target cell membrane and forming pores.

Commercial formulations include "Mosquito Dunks" and "Mosquito Bits". It is also available in bulk liquid or granular formulations for commercial and public agency use.

Long name
Bacillus thuringiensis subspecies israelensis strain EG2215

See also 
 Malaria

References

External links 
 Bacillus thuringiensis fact sheet
 EPA Controlling Mosquitoes at the Larval Stage

thuringiensis israelensis
Biological control agents of pest insects